Kamilla Gamme (born 1 March 1969) is a Norwegian diver, born in Hamar. She competed at the 1988 Summer Olympics in Seoul, where she placed seventh in women's 10 metre platform. She represented the club Hamar IL.

References

External links

1969 births
Living people
Sportspeople from Hamar
Norwegian female divers
Olympic divers of Norway
Divers at the 1988 Summer Olympics